Urartu Basketball Club, also currently known as Urartu Vivaro for sponsorship reasons, is a professional basketball team in Armenia, currently based in Yerevan. Founded in 2016 in Yerevan. The team is a founding member of the Armenia Basketball League A.

History
Urartu was founded in 2016 with the players who participated for national team in the European Championship for Small Countries played just months before. In its debut first season, the club joined the Russian Basketball Super League, but after nine rounds the team resigned to continue playing due to financial difficulties.

In 2017, the team joined the newly created Armenia Basketball League A, becoming one of the seven clubs that played the first season. Despite finishing the regular season with a perfect balance of 12 wins in 12 games, Urartu was eliminated in the semifinals by Artsakh.

Ara Poghosyan was the first president of the club who chaired between 2016 and 2017, followed by Karen Giloyan. Tigran Gyokchyan managed the team during the same period until late 2017 when he was replaced by Sargis Stepanyan.

Season by season

Current roster

Trophies
Armenian SuperCup (1): 2019

References

External links
Profile at Facebook
Eurobasket.com Urartu BC Page

2016 establishments in Armenia
Basketball teams established in 2016
Basketball teams in Armenia